Joniškis is a town in Lithuania.

Joniškis may also refer to:
Joniškis, Molėtai, a small town in  Utena County, Lithuania
, a village in Ignalina District Municipality, Lithuania